San Lorenzo Formation may refer to:
 San Lorenzo Formation, Bolivia, an Ordovician geologic formation in Bolivia
 San Lorenzo Formation, California, an Eocene to Miocene geologic formation in California